Turku Concert Hall is located on the north side of the Puutori market square in Turku, Finland. The hall was designed by architect Risto-Veikko Luukkonen and constructed in 1952. It was the first concert hall in Finland. The Turku Philharmonic Orchestra primarily performs at the concert hall but there are many top international venues that perform there as well.

There is one auditorium in the building and it was designed for concerts. Its audience capacity is 1,002. The acoustics are excellent.  In addition to concerts, conferences, plays, fairs and other events take place in the hall.

External links
 Meet Turku: Turku Concert Hall
 Turku Philharmonic Orchestra & Turku Concert Hall

Music venues completed in 1952
Buildings and structures in Turku
Concert halls in Finland
Tourist attractions in Turku